The Okolo Jižních Čech (meaning "Around South Bohemia") is a multi-day road cycling race that has been held annually in the Czech Republic since 2012. It is part of the UCI Europe Tour in category 2.2.

Winners

References

External links

Cycle races in the Czech Republic
Recurring sporting events established in 2012
2012 establishments in the Czech Republic
UCI Europe Tour races
South Bohemian Region